Buzzer Beater (stylized as BUZZER BEATER) is a Japanese manga series written and illustrated by Takehiko Inoue. The series debuted as a webcomic in 1996 and it was also serialized in Shueisha's Monthly Shōnen Jump shortly after its introduction on the web. An anime television series adaptation released in 2005, followed by a second season in 2007.

Characters
 

Jersey #:1
Position: Point guard
An orphaned street kid and boisterous 15-year-old who survived on the streets by hustling adult basketball players with his phenomenal skills. He was selected to the Earth All-Star team because of his superhuman speed. Hideyoshi is prone to paralyzing migraines during practice or in games. It was later revealed by DT that he is growing horns because he is a half-Goran taken from the symptoms, and DT's self history. Hideyoshi wears a wristband made of unique elastic material found only on the planet Goru, the sole memento from his unknown parents.
Cha-che

Jersey #:2
Position: Shooting guard
The teenage granddaughter of the team's creator, Yoshimune. Cha-che wanted nothing more than pleasing her grandfather and making his long-term dream come true: lead a complete team of Earthlings that will eventually conquer the Intergalactic League. She challenged Maru to a shooting match in order to join the team, where she sank a half-court shot. She is an extremely good sharpshooter who sank 2 10-point baskets early in the game against the Swallows, the first team they faced. In the anime, her shooting skills was the basis of a comeback which allowed her team to triumph over the Smoky Queen.
DT

Jersey #:9
Position: Point guard
Earth's best point guard and the captain of the team. with speed and mind numbing play. "DT" is a nickname that he gave himself, referring to his ability to put his opponents and teammates into a state of "dream time" when he plays. He has a friendly rivalry with Hideyoshi, similar to that between Sakuragi and Rukawa from Slam Dunk. DT is a former Goran, but broke off his horns when they began to manifest themselves when he was a teenager, and thus wears his trademark skull cap to hide the scars.
Ivan

Jersey #:55
Position: Power Forward
A 15-year-old who looks like a full-grown man. He had broad shoulders and adult-like definition. He met Hideyoshi during the elimination match to recruit players. He is the reigning shotblocking king of State R.
Maru
Jersey #:7
Position: Shooting guard

A player, known as the JBA's "shooting android", whose specialty is shooting. However it is shown that during the final minutes of an all-deciding match, he missed two free throws and then made one which he was purposely trying to miss. He revealed that he had then undergone "tough physical and mental training". In the anime, he was not able to show his skills against the Smoky Kings, missing all of his shots, however became a key part of the team in later matches. He is a fond parent who loves his children dearly.
Mo

Jersey #:35
Position: Center
A former sumo wrestler.
Rose

Jersey #:8
Position: Point guard
Stylish in purple, he loses to DT in the PG match because of his temper. He didn't go into the game vs. the Swallows because he had an injury.
Lazuli

Jersey #:21
Position: Small forward
A tall player who turns out to be a woman. In the anime, Lazuli was originally the captain of the Smoky Queens, a Goran team in the Underground League who often cheat to victory, and are notorious for injuring and brawling with their opponents. After Yoshimune's team defeated them, Lazuli joined the team on their quest to conquer the intergalactic league. Lazuli is an admirer of Apiru, the ace player for the Swallows who also happens to be a woman.
Han

Jersey #:12 (manga only), #5(anime)
Position: Point guard/Small forward
He is a tall PG, tall enough to be a center, second only to Mo in terms of height . He was in the Earth's team because of his elegant ball-handling skills. He is calm in the match against DT for the PG position but was unable to show his real skills. He was deployed as SF against the Swallows. In the anime version, his number is #5.
Yoshimune

The extremely wealthy millionaire who oversaw the recruitment and formation of the Earth's team in his bid to win the Intergalactic league. Although 77, he is still vigorous and takes an active role in overseeing the team's training and play during games.
Liz Murdoch

Liz is the coach for the Earth team, and is half Goran. Her father, Mr. Murdoch, is the Goran president of the Intergalactic Basketball League.

Media

Webcomic
Inoue launched Buzzer Beater as an online comic in May 1996 on the Sports-i ESPN website (now J Sports). It was his second manga to focus on basketball, following his very successful second manga series, Slam Dunk. The name of the manga comes from the term used for when a basket is scored at the same moment a period or the game itself ends. Buzzer Beater was published in print format by Shueisha shortly after it began, as it was serialized in its Monthly Shōnen Jump manga magazine from February 1997 to August 1998. The manga was collected in four wideban volumes, released from Juy 4, 1997, to August 4, 1998. It was later republished in two volumes, released on February 4, 2005.

In May 2021, Manga Planet announced that they licensed the series for English digital release starting in June of the same year.

Anime
Buzzer Beater is Inoue's second manga series to have been adopted into an anime. A 13 episode TV series was produced by TMS Entertainment and premiered on WOWOW from February 5, 2005, ending its run on May 7, 2005. A second 13 episode series, continuing the story and also animated by TMS, premiered on Nippon Television on July 4, 2007 and ended its run on September 26, 2007. Both anime adaptations were supervised by Inoue. The anime series includes story elements and characters that were either hinted at or did not originally appear in the manga.

References

Further reading

External links
 Buzzer Beater at Takehiko Inoue's site (archived June 6, 2012)
 TMS Buzzer Beater anime site  
 

1990s webcomics
1996 webcomic debuts
Anime series based on manga
Basketball in anime and manga
Japanese webcomics
Science fiction anime and manga
Shōnen manga
Shueisha manga
Shueisha franchises
Sports webcomics
Takehiko Inoue
TMS Entertainment
Webcomics in print
Wowow original programming